A boater is a type of hat.

Boater may also refer to:
Boater, one of the first disposable diapers
Someone involved in boating
Boaters, a term which refers to a pair of boat shoe